Manuel García (born 20 April 1955) is a Spanish biathlete. He competed in the 20 km individual event at the 1984 Winter Olympics.

References

1955 births
Living people
Spanish male biathletes
Olympic biathletes of Spain
Biathletes at the 1984 Winter Olympics
Sportspeople from Ourense